George E. Keogan (March 8, 1890 – February 17, 1943) was an American football, basketball, and baseball coach, most known for coaching basketball at the University of Notre Dame from 1923 to 1943.  Keogan never had a losing season in his 20 years at Notre Dame.

The Minnesota Lake, Minnesota native attended University of Minnesota from 1909 to 1913. He began coaching high school varsities after his freshman year in college, guiding first Lockport High School (1910–1911) followed by Riverside High School (1911–1912). Meanwhile, he was also coaching several college basketball teams: Charles City College in Iowa (1909–1910), Superior State Teachers College in Wisconsin (1912–1914), Saint Louis University (1914–15) and the University of St. Thomas in St. Paul, Minnesota (1917–1918). During World War I he served at Great Lakes Naval Training Station.  After briefly coaching Allegheny College in Meadville, Pennsylvania (1919–1920) and Valparaiso, Keogan arrived at University of Notre Dame. He served as head basketball and baseball coach, as well as assistant to the legendary football coach Knute Rockne. Keogan compiled a 327–96–1 at Notre Dame.

Keogan died on February 17, 1943, of a heart attack at his home in South Bend, Indiana.  After his death, Moose Krause took over his job as Notre Dame's head basketball coach.  Keogan was inducted into the Naismith Memorial Basketball Hall of Fame in 1961 and the National Collegiate Basketball Hall of Fame in 2006.

Head coaching record

Football

Basketball

References

External links
 
 

1890 births
1943 deaths
Allegheny Gators men's basketball coaches
American men's basketball coaches
Basketball coaches from Minnesota
College men's basketball head coaches in the United States
High school basketball coaches in the United States
Naismith Memorial Basketball Hall of Fame inductees
National Collegiate Basketball Hall of Fame inductees
Notre Dame Fighting Irish baseball coaches
Notre Dame Fighting Irish football coaches
Notre Dame Fighting Irish men's basketball coaches
People from Minnesota Lake, Minnesota
Saint Louis Billikens men's basketball coaches
Saint Louis Billikens football coaches
St. Thomas (Minnesota) Tommies football coaches
St. Thomas (Minnesota) Tommies men's basketball coaches
University of Minnesota alumni
Valparaiso Beacons football coaches
Valparaiso Beacons men's basketball coaches
Valparaiso Beacons baseball coaches
Wisconsin–Superior Yellowjackets men's basketball coaches